Orr v. Orr, 440 U.S. 268 (1979), was a United States Supreme Court case that held that a statutory scheme in Alabama that imposed alimony obligations on husbands but not on wives was an unconstitutional equal protection violation.

Background 
The state of Alabama had adopted a statutory scheme that imposed alimony obligations on husbands but not on wives for the stated purpose of addressing the economic disparity between men and women by providing support for needy women after divorce.

Ruth Bader Ginsburg and Margaret Moses Young filed a brief for the American Civil Liberties Union as amicus curiae urging reversal.

Opinion of the Court 
Applying intermediate scrutiny, the Court determined that the statute was not substantially related to the stated purpose. The Court observed that a gender neutral statute would still have the effect of providing for needy women, and that the only difference created by the Alabama statute was to also provide support for well off women that did not need support and to exclude needy men from support.

References

External links
 

United States equal protection case law
United States Supreme Court cases
United States Supreme Court cases of the Burger Court
1979 in United States case law
United States family case law
United States men's rights case law